Frederick Tommy (24 September 1941 – 3 February 2004) was a Canadian alpine skier who competed in the 1960 Winter Olympics.

References

1941 births
2004 deaths
Canadian male alpine skiers
Olympic alpine skiers of Canada
Alpine skiers at the 1960 Winter Olympics